Anapirika Iteon is a neighbourhood in the southern part of the city of Patras. The origin of the name ("Disabled people area") probably derives from the properties of war disabled people there.

Nearest places
 Ities, south
 Kokkinos Milos, south
 Krya Iteon, north
 Lefka, east
 Paralia, south

References
 Δ. Καρατζά, Χ. Χαραλάμπους, Δ. Γκότση, Γ. Λύρα, Πάτρα, ονομάτων επίσκεψις, Έκδοση των εφημερίδων Εθνικός Κήρυξ των Πατρών και Ημερήσιος Κήρυξ των Πατρών, Πάτρα 1995, p. 271 (in Greek)

Neighborhoods in Patras